Ryan Evan Stewart (born September 25, 1973) is a former American football safety in the National Football League (NFL). He played for the Detroit Lions (1996–2000). He played collegiately for the Georgia Tech football team.  He now hosts an Atlanta radio show, 2 Live Stews, with his brother Doug Stewart.

He was a contributor to ESPN's First Take.

References

1973 births
Living people
People from Moncks Corner, South Carolina
Players of American football from South Carolina
American football safeties
Georgia Tech Yellow Jackets football players
Detroit Lions players
American sports radio personalities